The Southeastern Wisconsin Till Plains is an ecoregion in southeastern Wisconsin and northeastern Illinois in the United States. It is a Level III ecoregion in the classification system of the United States Environmental Protection Agency (EPA), where it is designated as ecoregion number 53. The ecoregion represents a transition between the hardwood forests and oak savannas to the west and the tallgrass prairie ecoregions to the south; it is today mostly covered by cropland.

Level IV ecoregions 
Following is a list of smaller Level IV ecoregions within the Southeastern Wisconsin Till Plains ecoregion, as defined by the EPA.

See also 
 List of ecoregions in the United States (EPA)
 List of ecoregions in North America (CEC)
 List of ecoregions in Wisconsin
 Geography of Wisconsin
 Climate of Wisconsin

References 

Ecoregions of Illinois
Ecoregions of Wisconsin
Ecoregions of the United States